Self-hypnosis or auto-hypnosis (as distinct from hetero-hypnosis) is a form, a process, or the result of a self-induced hypnotic state.

Frequently, self-hypnosis is used as a vehicle to enhance the efficacy of self-suggestion; and, in such cases, the subject "plays the dual role of suggester and suggestee". 

The nature of the auto-suggestive practice may be, at one extreme, "concentrative", wherein "all attention is so totally focused on (the words of the auto-suggestive formula, e.g. "Every day, in every way, I'm getting better and better") that everything else is kept out of awareness" and, at the other, "inclusive", wherein subjects "allow all kinds of thoughts, emotions, memories, and the like to drift into their consciousness".

Typological distinctions
From their extensive investigations, Erika Fromm and Stephen Kahn (1990) identified significant and distinctive differences between the application of the wide variety of practices that lie within the domain commonly, equivocally, and ambiguously identified as "self-hypnosis". Based upon their distinctions, "self-hypnosis" practices can be separated into, at least, thirteen different types:

Subject creating hypnotic source ex nihilo 
In relation to the effects of the subject either creating their own self-hypnosis programme ex nihilo, or adapting the clinician's programme in some way in order to "improve" upon it, and in the spirit of the aphorism "he who represents himself has a fool for a client", Ainslie Meares (1978) reports on the case of a woman with an advanced cancer of both breasts (and spinal metastases), who went into full remission, using his "program of intensive meditation" (essentially a very deep self hypnosis, with no suggestion, and no imagery). At this stage, Meares went overseas for three and a half weeks, and she was instructed to continue using Meares' approach, entirely on her own, while he was away from Australia. In his absence, in a "burst of overconfidence she departed from the profound simplicity of the type of meditation she had been taught", and, she thought, "improved upon it" by using the sort of vivid visualization techniques promoted by the Simontons (viz., Simonton & Simonton, 1975). She (unilaterally) "changed the pattern of the meditation, and she almost immediately relapsed". On his return, Meares induced her to resume his "extremely simple and profound form of meditation in which she was originally instructed" and, once again, she went into full remission.

History

James Braid
The English term "hypnotism" was introduced in 1841 by the Scottish physician and surgeon James Braid. According to Braid, he first employed "self-hypnotism" (as he elsewhere refers to it) two years after discovering hypnotism, first teaching it to his clients before employing it on himself:

In a later work, Observations on Trance or Human Hybernation (1850), Braid provides probably the first account of self-hypnosis:

Émile Coué
Émile Coué was one of the most influential figures in the subsequent development of self-hypnosis. His method of "conscious autosuggestion" became an internationally renowned self-help system at the start of the 20th century. Although Coué distanced himself from the concept of "hypnosis", he sometimes referred to what he was doing as self-hypnosis, as did his followers such as Charles Baudouin. Modern hypnotherapists regard Coué as part of their own field.

Autogenic training
Autogenic training is a relaxation technique developed by the German psychiatrist Johannes Schultz and first published in 1932. Schultz based his approach on the work of the German hypnotist Oskar Vogt. The technique involves a step-by-step progression that begins from physiological conditioning, such as muscle relaxation, breathing control and heart rate control. Then it advances to psychic conditioning through mental imagery, acoustic therapy, etc.

Steps commonly used for self-hypnosis
Self-hypnosis requires four distinct steps.
Motivation. Without proper motivation, an individual will find it very difficult to practice self-hypnosis.
Relaxation. The individual must be thoroughly relaxed and must set aside time to perform this act. Additionally, distractions should be eliminated as full attention is needed.
Concentration. The individual needs to concentrate completely as progress is made each time the mind focuses on a single image.
Directing. This is an option used only when the individual wants to work on a specific goal. The individual must direct their concentration on visualizing the desired result.

Uses
Self-hypnosis is used extensively in modern hypnotherapy. It can take the form of hypnosis carried out by means of a learned routine.

Hypnosis may help pain management, anxiety, depression, sleep disorders, obesity, asthma, and skin conditions. When this practice is mastered, it can improve concentration, recall, enhance problem solving, alleviate headaches and even improve one's control of emotions.

Pain
Fromm & Kaplan observe that the value, significance, and importance of self-hypnosis is not just that it promotes relaxation, relieves tension and anxiety, and reduces the level of physical pain and suffering, but also that, in teaching patients self-hypnosis, clinicians sensibly recognize that they can't be with their patients at all times—especially, at those times when they are in pain—and, through that process of teaching self-hypnosis, they actively provide their patients with a 24-hours-a-day-available "tool by means of which they can learn to control and master it, or at least be able to live with reduced pain".

Self-hypnosis and stress
Patients who are stressed and/or lack self-esteem can be taught self-hypnosis techniques which can induce relaxation and/or strengthen their self-esteem. Specifically, once the patient is in a self-hypnotic state the therapist can communicate messages to the patient, allowing the relaxation and strengthening process to occur.

Often, when teaching self-hypnosis, a subject is taught a specific "trigger word" (that will only induce self-hypnosis when the subject deliberately uses the word to hypnotize themselves) to facilitate the rapid induction of the hypnotic state. Also, a phrase (often termed an "autosuggestion") might be taught to the subject for them to repeat to themselves when in self-hypnosis.

In addition, since stress prevents well-functioning of the immune system, researchers from the Ohio State University came to a conclusion that self hypnosis to prevent stress can also help in protecting the immune system against the negative effects of it. They proved this by showing that students who performed self-hypnosis during stressful exam weeks showed a stronger immune system when compared to those who did not learn self-hypnosis.

Childbirth anesthesia
Self-hypnosis can help women who are in labor to alleviate their pain. Joseph DeLee, an obstetrician, stated in the early 20th century that hypnosis was the only risk-free childbirth anesthetic. Common self-hypnotic techniques include:
 Glove anesthesia: Pretending the hand is numb and placing it upon a painful region to remove the sensation there.
 Time distortion: Perceiving periods of time accompanied by pain as shorter in length and those free of pain as longer lasting.
 Imaginative transformation: Viewing the pain as a non-threatening, acceptable sensation (perhaps merely pressure) that causes no trouble.

Other uses
Self-directed thought which is based in hypnosis can be used for many other issues and behavioral problems.

Research
Reviewing the findings of three previous studies in this area, John F. Kihlstrom concluded: "Comparisons of self-hypnosis with more traditional 'hetero'-hypnosis show that they are highly correlated." At the same time, Kihlstrom questioned the extent to which most self-hypnosis qualitatively resembled the experience of traditional hetero-hypnosis.

See also
Autosuggestion
Covert conditioning
Guided meditation

Footnotes

References

 Alman, B.M. & Lambrou, P., Self-Hypnosis: The Complete Manual for Health and Self-Change (Second Edition), Souvenir Press, (London), 1983.
 Araoz, D.L., "Negative Self-Hypnosis", Journal of Contemporary Psychotherapy, Vol.12, No.1, (Spring/Summer 1981), pp. 45–52.
 Atkinson, W.W., Suggestion and Autosuggestion, The Progress Company, (Chicago), 1909.
 
 Barber, T.X., "Changing “Unchangeable” Bodily Processes by (Hypnotic) Suggestions: A New Look at Hypnosis, Cognitions, Imagining, and the Mind-Body Problem", pp. 69–127 in A.A. Sheikh (ed.), Imagination and Healing, Baywood Publishing Company (Farmingdale), 1984.
 Baudouin, C. (Paul, E & Paul, C. trans.), Suggestion and Autosuggestion: A Psychological and Pedagogical Study Based on the Investigations made by the New Nancy School, George Allen & Unwin, (London), 1920.
 
 Braid, J., Neurypnology or the Rationale of Nervous Sleep Considered in Relation with Animal Magnetism Illustrated by Numerous Cases of its Successful Application in the Relief and Cure of Disease, John Churchill, (London), 1843.
N.B. Braid's Errata, detailing a number of important corrections that need to be made to the foregoing text, is on the un-numbered page following p.265.
 Braid, J., Observations on Trance; or, Human Hybernation, John Churchill, (London), 1850.
 Carpenter, W.B., "On the Influence of Suggestion in Modifying and directing Muscular Movement, independently of Volition", Royal Institution of Great Britain, (Proceedings), 1852, (12 March 1852), pp. 147–153. 
 Coué, E., & Orton, J.L., Conscious Auto-Suggestion, T. Fisher Unwin Limited, (London), 1924.
 Fromm, E. & Kahn, S., Self-hypnosis: The Chicago Paradigm, The Guilford Press, (New York), 1990. 
 
 Gravitz, M.A., "The First Use of Self-Hypnosis: Mesmer Mesmerizes Mesmer", American Journal of Clinical Hypnosis, Vol.37, No.1, (July 1994), pp. 49–52.
 Hartland, J., "The Value of “Ego-Strengthening” Procedures Prior to Direct Symptom-Removal Under Hypnosis", American Journal of Clinical Hypnosis, Vol.8, No.2, (October 1965), pp. 89–93.
 Hartland, J., "The General Principles of Suggestion", The American Journal of Clinical Hypnosis, Vol.9, No.3, January 1967, pp. 211–219.
 Hartland, J. (1971a), "The Approach to Hypnotherapy — “Permissive” or Otherwise?", American Journal of Clinical Hypnosis, Vol.13, No.3, (January 1971), pp.153-154.
 Hartland, J. (1971b), "Further Observations on the Use of “Ego-Strengthening” Techniques", American Journal of Clinical Hypnosis, Vol.14, No.1, (July 1971), pp. 1–8.
 Hartland, J., "The General Principles and Construction of Therapeutic Suggestion", Terpnos Logos, the Australian Journal of Medical Sophrology and Hypnotherapy, Vol.2, No.3, August 1974, pp. 26–32.
 
 Hollander, B., Methods and Uses of Hypnosis & Self-Hypnosis: A Treatise on the Powers of the Subconscious Mind, George Allen & Unwin, (London), 1928.
 Johnson, L.S., "Self-Hypnosis: Behavioral And Phenomenological Comparisons With Heterohypnosis", International Journal of Clinical and Experimental Hypnosis, Vol.27, No.3, (1979), pp. 240–264.
 Johnson, L.S., "Current Research in Self-Hypnotic Phenomenology: The Chicago Paradigm", International Journal of Clinical and Experimental Hypnosis, Vol.29, No.3, (1981), pp. 247–258.
 Johnson, L.S., Dawson, S.L., Clark, J.L. & Sikorsky, C., "Self-Hypnosis Versus Heterohypnosis: Order Effects And Sex Differences In Behavioral And Experiential Impact", International Journal of Clinical and Experimental Hypnosis, Vol.31, No.3, (1983), pp. 139–154.
 Johnson, L.S. & Weight, D.G., "Self-hypnosis Versus Heterohypnosis: Experiential and Behavioral Comparisons", Journal of Abnormal Psychology, Vol.85, No.5, (1976), pp. 523–526.
 
 
 Killeen, P.R. & Nash , M.R., "The Four Causes of Hypnosis", International Journal of Clinical and Experimental Hypnosis, Vol.51, No.3, (July 2003), pp.195-231. 
 Kohen, D.P., Mahowald, M.W. & Rosen, G.M., "Sleep-Terror Disorder in Children: The Role of Self-Hypnosis in Management", American Journal of Clinical Hypnosis, Vol.34, No.4, (April 1992), pp. 233–244.
 Lang, E.V., Joyce, J.S., Spiegel, D., Hamilton, D. & Lee, K.K., "Self-Hypnotic Relaxation During Interventional Radiological Procedures: Effects on Pain Perception and Intravenous Drug Use", International Journal of Clinical and Experimental Hypnosis, Vol.44, No.2, (April 1996), pp. 106–119.
 
 Madrid, A., Rostel, G., Pennington, D. & Murphy, D., "Subjective Assessment of Allergy Relief Following Group Hypnosis and Self-Hypnosis: A Preliminary Study", American Journal of Clinical Hypnosis, Vol.38, No.2, (October 1995), pp. 80–86.
 Meares, A., "Vivid Visualization and Dim Visual Awareness in the Regression of Cancer in Meditation", Journal of the American Society of Psychosomatic Dentistry and Medicine, Vol.25, No.3, (1978), pp. 85–88.
 
 
 Pally, R., "The Predicting Brain: Unconscious Repetition, Conscious Reflection and Therapeutic Change", The International Journal of Psychoanalysis, Vol.88, No.4, (August 2007), pp.861-881. 
 
 
 Paulhus, D.L. (1993). Bypassing the Will: The Automatization of Affirmations, in D.M. Wegner & J.W. Pennebaker (Eds.), Handbook of Mental Control (pp.573-587). Englewood Cliffs, NJ: Prentice-Hall.
 Pekala, R.J., Maurer, R., Kumar, V.K., Elliott, N.C., Maston, E., Moon, E. & Salinger, M., "Self-Hypnosis Relapse Prevention Training with Chronic Drug/Alcohol Users: Effects on Self-Esteem, Affect, and Relapse", American Journal of Clinical Hypnosis, Vol.46, No.4, (April 2004), pp. 281–297.
 Rausch, V., "Cholecystectomy with Self-Hypnosis", American Journal of Clinical Hypnosis, Vol.22, No.3, (January 1980), pp. 124–129.
 Ruch, J.C., "Self-Hypnosis: The Result Of Heterohypnosis Or Vice Versa?", International Journal of Clinical and Experimental Hypnosis, Vol.23, No.4, (1975), pp. 282–304.
 
 Shaw, H.L., "Hypnosis And Drama: A Note On A Novel Use Of Self-Hypnosis", International Journal of Clinical and Experimental Hypnosis, Vol.26, No.3, (1978), pp. 154–157.
 Simonton, O.C. & Simonton S.S., "Belief Systems and Management of the Emotional Aspects of Malignancy, The Journal of Transpersonal Psychology, Vol.7, No.1, (January 1975), pp.29-47. 
 Singer, J.L. & Pope, K.S., "Daydreaming And Imagery Skills As Predisposing Capacities For Self-Hypnosis", International Journal of Clinical and Experimental Hypnosis, Vol.29, No.3, (1981), pp. 271–281.
 Soskis, D.A., Teaching Self-Hypnosis: An Introductory Guide for Clinicians, W.W. Norton & Co., (New York), 1986.
 Sparks, L., Self-Hypnosis: A Conditioned-Response Technique, Grune & Stratton, (New York), 1962.
 Spence, C., Hypnotherapy can subconsciously suggest changes to the circadian sleep patterns which govern our sleep and wake patterns. 
 Spiegel, D. & Chase, R.A., "The treatment of contractures of the hand using self-hypnosis", Journal of Hand Surgery, Vol.5, No.5, (September 1980), pp. 428–432.
 Spiegel, H., "A Single-Treatment Method to Stop Smoking Using Ancillary Self-Hypnosis", The International Journal of Clinical and Experimental Hypnosis, Vol.18, No.4, (October 1970), pp. 235–269.
 Straus, R.A., Strategic Self-Hypnosis (Revised Edition), Prentice Hall, (New York), 1988.
 Straus, R.A., Creative Self-Hypnosis, Prentice Hall, (New York), 1989.
 Wark, D.M., "Teaching college students better learning skills using self-hypnosis", American Journal of Clinical Hypnosis, Vol.38, No.4, (April 1996), pp. 277–287.
 Yeates, L.B., "The "MORE TEST": A Mechanism for Increasing the Efficiency of Suggestion", Australian Journal of Clinical Hypnotherapy & Hypnosis, Vol.23, No.1, (March 2002), pp.1-17.
 Yeates, L.B., James Braid: Surgeon, Gentleman Scientist, and Hypnotist, Ph.D. Dissertation, School of History and Philosophy of Science, Faculty of Arts & Social Sciences, University of New South Wales, January 2013.
 Yeates, L.B. (2014a), "Hartland’s Legacy (I): The Ego-Strengthening Procedure", Australian Journal of Clinical Hypnotherapy & Hypnosis, Vol.36, No.1, (Autumn 2014), pp.4-18.
 Yeates, L.B. (2014b), "Hartland’s Legacy (II): The Ego-Strengthening Monologue", Australian Journal of Clinical Hypnotherapy & Hypnosis, Vol.36, No.1, (Autumn 2014), pp.19-36.
 Yeates, L.B. (2016a), "Émile Coué and his Method (I): The Chemist of Thought and Human Action", Australian Journal of Clinical Hypnotherapy & Hypnosis, Volume 38, No.1, (Autumn 2016), pp.3-27. 
 Yeates, L.B. (2016b), "Émile Coué and his Method (II): Hypnotism, Suggestion, Ego-Strengthening, and Autosuggestion", Australian Journal of Clinical Hypnotherapy & Hypnosis, Volume 38, No.1, (Autumn 2016), pp.28-54. 
 Yeates, L.B. (2016c), "Émile Coué and his Method (III): Every Day in Every Way", Australian Journal of Clinical Hypnotherapy & Hypnosis, Volume 38, No.1, (Autumn 2016), pp.55-79. 
 Young, P., Personal Change Through Self-Hypnosis, Vivid Publishing, (Fremantle), 2016. 

Mind–body interventions